The ICP Savannah is a high-wing, single-engine, ultralight with side-by-side seating for two produced in Italy by ICP srl.  It has sold in large numbers, particularly in Europe.  The Savannah is in production, sold in both kit and ready-to-fly form.

Design and development
The Savannah is a conventionally laid-out two-seat aircraft which can be bought in ready-to-fly or kit form. It is commonly registered as a light-sport aircraft in the United States and as an ultralight in some other jurisdictions and is considered a microlight aircraft in New Zealand. It has much in common with the Zenith CH 701 designed by the late Chris Heintz (1938–2021), though the Savannah has a different empennage; later versions have further diverged from the Zenith, particularly in the wing design. Manufacture (both ready to fly and kits) is done in the ICP premises located in Castelnuovo Don Bosco (Piedmont, Italy), where the firm moved on September 10, 2009 from the original plant in Piovà Massaia.

Structurally, the Savannah is a metal semi-monocoque.  Most variants have a constant-chord wing like that of the Zenith, with flaps and ailerons combined into Junkers-style flaperons. The Savannah Advanced has a shorter, tapered wing. Early variants retained full-span leading edge slots, later replaced with vortex generators.  The high wing is braced to the lower fuselage with a V-pair of struts on each side.  At their base, the spatted mainwheels of the tricycle undercarriage are mounted on cantilever legs. The Savannah can be mounted on Kevlar/carbon fiber floats; swapping from land to water gear takes about 150 minutes. An alternative floatplane version, using amphibious floats, was called the Savannah Hydro.

Savannahs have been powered with a variety of small engines in the 35–70 kW range. The cabin seats two side by side under the wing, the newer XL version having increased width and enhanced glazing. Aft, the fuselage is flat-sided, with the underside rising towards the tail.  The rectangular tailplane and elevators, which use a conventional airfoil unlike that of the Zenith, are set at the top of the fuselage, with the rudder running between the elevators to the keel.  Fin and rudder are straight-tapered and slightly swept. The ICP factory may supply a rudder extension as an optional extra.

Zenith STOL CH 701 designer, the late Chris Heintz, considers the Savannah an unauthorized copy of his design. Despite this, ICP and Zenair began a partnership in 2012 whereby ICP assembles the ready-to-fly version of the low wing Zenair 650Ei, an evolution of the AMD Zodiac, for the European market.

Operational history
Sales, beginning around 2000, had by 2010 reached 650 aircraft or kits.  As of mid-2010 there have been about 513 Savannahs and Bingos on the registers of European countries west of Russia.  Smaller numbers fly in North America, where the agents was Skykits Co., replaced in 2011 by I.C.P. Aviation North America, LLC (ICPANA), and elsewhere. In Australia and New Zealand, the 600 kg version of the Savannah XL and Savannah S are growing in popularity. As an example, as of March 2022 there are three types of Savannahs on the New Zealand aircraft register. This includes eight VG models, two XL models and 23 S models for a total of 33 Savannah aircraft. Currently, there are another seven S models under construction in New Zealand. In Australia, the best estimate is that there are in excess of 100 completed Savannahs flying; many more are under construction.

It is expected that the total number of ICP aircraft (all models, mainly Savannah and Bingo) produced exceeded 2,000 units by the end of 2011.

In 2008 an order from the Indian Air Force was expected.

Variants

Data from Jane's All the World's Aircraft 2010/11
Bingo 50337 kW (50 hp) two cylinder in line, two-stroke Rotax 503 engine.
Super BingoFirst flown 19 October 2001. 68 kW (92 hp) two cylinder in line, geared Simonini Victor 2 engine.
Bingo 4TIntroduced 2003. 45 kW (60 hp) two cylinder horizontally opposed four-stroke HKS 700E engine.
VimanaIntroduced 2006. Current production, 2011.  Optimised for STOL performance, with the Savannah ADV wing with double-slotted Fowler flaps, leading edge slats, single bracing struts and a slimmer fuselage. Powered by the ) Rotax 912 ULS four-stroke engine.  It is marketed in North America as the Rampage.
Savannah "Classic" with leading edge slats
Introduced in 1997. Production of the "Classic" model has ceased because leading edge slats are inefficient due additional drag; this aircraft is no longer available from ICP. This leaves the following five Savannah variants  in production in December 2020: 
Savannah ADV
Model with redesigned tapered wing of  span and  area, with full-span flaperons. Top speed of 
Savannah VG
Introduced 2004. This is essentially the "Classic" but with leading edge slats replaced by vortex generators and a slightly different wing profile introduced to gain a faster cruise with very little sacrifice to the stall speed which now 50 km/h (31 mph). Engine choices: 74 kW (99 hp) Rotax 912 ULS flat four; 60 kW (80 hp) Jabiru 2200 flat four; or the 60 kW (80 hp) Suzuki G10 three cylinder inline.

Savannah XL
Introduced in 2009. As Savannah VG but with cabin width increased to 1,130 mm by bulged, transparent doors; a transparent cabin roof was also introduced for flight safety; this model received a windscreen with a more aerodynamic slope and revised cowling lines. The XL was the first to be installed with rudder pedals that can be adjusted up to 100 mm. The XL model is known in North America as the Savannah VGW. 
Savannah S
New model introduced in 2010, with rounded tail fuselage corners. The S is derived from XL (and therefore retains the 1,130 mm cabin width, fully transparent doors; the safer, transparent cabin roof, adjustable rudder pedals, the more aerodynamic, raked windscreen and the XL's integrated cowling lines). This model also does not have the 'corrugated' fuselage sides found on all the previous Savannah models. The Savannah S is the flagship model of the range. Engines used in the Savannah S model include the Austrian manufactured Rotax 912, the Honda-based Viking 130  and the Suzuki-based Aeromomentum AM13  and AM15  engines.
Savannah T
Taildragger model, introduced in 2013.

Specifications (XL - Jabiru engine)

References

External links

 ICP official website
 ICP North America official website

2000s Italian sport aircraft
Ultralight aircraft
High-wing aircraft
Single-engined tractor aircraft